Jacob Fox (born Henry Fuchs; September 27, 1879 – August 21, 1947) was a Major League Baseball pitcher.

Fox played for the Philadelphia Phillies in the  season. In one career game, he had a 0-0 record with an 18.00 ERA, with 1 save.

Fox was born and died in Scranton, Pennsylvania.

External links

1879 births
1947 deaths
Philadelphia Phillies players
Major League Baseball pitchers
Baseball players from Pennsylvania
Newark Sailors players